Bidahochi (also known as Bitahochee) is a populated place situated in Navajo County, Arizona, United States. The nearby Bidahochi Formation was named for Bidahochi.

References

Populated places in Navajo County, Arizona